Argyresthia perezi is a moth of the family Yponomeutidae. It is found in Spain.

References

Moths described in 2001
Argyresthia
Moths of Europe